New Amsterdam (or ) was a 17th-century Dutch settlement established at the southern tip of Manhattan Island that served as the seat of the colonial government in New Netherland. The initial trading factory gave rise to the settlement around Fort Amsterdam. The fort was situated on the strategic southern tip of the island of Manhattan and was meant to defend the fur trade operations of the Dutch West India Company in the North River (Hudson River). In 1624, it became a provincial extension of the Dutch Republic and was designated as the capital of the province in 1625.

By 1655, the population of New Netherland had grown to 2,000 people, with 1,500 living in New Amsterdam. By 1664, the population of New Netherland had risen to almost 9,000 people, 2,500 of whom lived in New Amsterdam, 1,000 lived near Fort Orange, and the remainder in other towns and villages.

In 1664, the English took over New Amsterdam and renamed it New York after the Duke of York (later James II & VII). After the Second Anglo-Dutch War of 1665–67, England and the United Provinces of the Netherlands agreed to the status quo in the Treaty of Breda. The English kept the island of Manhattan, the Dutch giving up their claim to the town and the rest of the colony, while the English formally abandoned Surinam in South America, and the island of Run in the East Indies to the Dutch, confirming their control of the valuable Spice Islands. What was once New Amsterdam became New York City's downtown, today known as Lower Manhattan.

Etymology 
The indigenous Munsee term for the southern tip of the island was Manhattoe, and variations of this name were also applied to the first Dutch settlement there. With the construction of Fort Amsterdam, the town also became variously known as "Amsterdam" or "New Amsterdam". New Amsterdam's city limits did not extend north of the wall of Wall Street, and neither the remainder of the island of Manhattan nor of wider New Netherland fell under its definition.

History

Early settlement (1609–1624)

In 1524, nearly a century before the arrival of the Dutch, the site that would later become New Amsterdam was named Nouvelle Angoulême by the Italian explorer Giovanni da Verrazzano, to commemorate his patron King Francis I of France, whose family consisted of the Counts of Angoulême. The first recorded exploration by the Dutch of the area around what is now called New York Bay was in 1609 with the voyage of the ship Halve Maen (English: "Half Moon"), commanded by Henry Hudson in the service of the Dutch Republic, as the emissary of Maurice of Nassau, Prince of Orange and stadholder of Holland. Hudson named the river the Mauritius River. He was also covertly attempting to find the Northwest Passage for the Dutch East India Company. Instead, he brought back news about the possibility of exploitation of beaver by the Dutch who sent commercial, private missions to the area the following years.

At the time, beaver pelts were highly prized in Europe, because the fur could be felted to make waterproof hats. A by-product of the trade in beaver pelts was castoreum—the secretion of the animals' anal glands—which was used for its medicinal properties and for perfumes. The expeditions by Adriaen Block and Hendrick Christiaensen in 1611, 1612, 1613 and 1614, resulted in the surveying and charting of the region from the 38th parallel to the 45th parallel. On their 1614 map, which gave them a four-year trade monopoly under a patent of the States General, they named the newly discovered and mapped territory New Netherland for the first time. It also showed the first year-round trading presence in New Netherland, Fort Nassau, which would be replaced in 1624 by Fort Orange, which eventually grew into the town of Beverwijck, renamed Albany in 1664.

Spanish trader Juan Rodriguez (rendered in Dutch as Jan Rodrigues), was born in the Captaincy General of Santo Domingo, the first Spanish Colony in the Americas. Allegedly of Portuguese and African descent, he arrived on Manhattan Island during the winter of 1613–1614 under the command of Thijs Volckenz Mossel captain of the Jonge Tobias, trapping beavers and trading with the local population as a representative of the Dutch East India Company. He is the first recorded non-Indigenous inhabitant of what would eventually become New York City.

The territory of New Netherland was originally a private, profit-making commercial enterprise focused on cementing alliances and conducting trade with the local Indigenous peoples. Surveying and exploration of the region was conducted as a prelude to an anticipated official settlement by the Dutch Republic, which occurred in 1624.

Pilgrims' attempt to settle in the Hudson River area

In 1620 the Pilgrims attempted to sail to the Hudson River from England. However, Mayflower reached Cape Cod (now part of Massachusetts) on November 9, 1620, after a voyage of 64 days. For a variety of reasons, primarily a shortage of supplies, Mayflower could not proceed to the Hudson River, and the colonists decided to settle near Cape Cod, establishing the Plymouth Colony.

Dutch return

The mouth of the Hudson River was selected as the ideal place for initial settlement as it had easy access to the ocean while also securing an ice-free lifeline to the beaver trading post near present-day Albany. Here, Indigenous hunters supplied them with pelts in exchange for European-made trade goods and wampum, which was soon being made by the Dutch on Long Island. In 1621, the Dutch West India Company was founded. Between 1621 and 1623, orders were given to the private, commercial traders to vacate the territory, thus opening up the territory to Dutch settlers and company traders. It also allowed the laws and ordinances of the states of Holland to apply. Previously, during the private, commercial period, only the law of the ship had applied.

In May 1624, the first settlers in New Netherland arrived on Noten Eylandt (Nut or Nutten Island, now Governors Island) aboard the ship New Netherland under the command of Cornelius Jacobsen May, who disembarked on the island with thirty families to take legal possession of the New Netherland territory. The families were then dispersed to Fort Wilhelmus on Verhulsten Island (Burlington Island) in the South River (now the Delaware River), to Kievitshoek (now Old Saybrook, Connecticut) at the mouth of the Verse River (now the Connecticut River) and further north at Fort Nassau on the Mauritius or North River (now the Hudson River), near what is now Albany.

A fort and sawmill were soon erected at Nut Island. The latter was constructed by Franchoys Fezard and was taken apart for iron in 1648.

Fort Amsterdam (1624)

The threat of attack from other European colonial powers prompted the directors of the Dutch West India Company to formulate a plan to protect the entrance to the Hudson River. In 1624, 30 families were sponsored by Dutch West India Company moving from Nut Island to Manhattan Island, where a citadel to contain Fort Amsterdam was being laid out by Cryn Frederickz van Lobbrecht at the direction of Willem Verhulst. By the end of 1625, the site had been staked out directly south of Bowling Green on the site of the present U.S. Custom House. The Mohawk-Mahican War in the Hudson Valley led the company to relocate even more settlers to the vicinity of the new Fort Amsterdam. In the end, colonizing was a prohibitively expensive undertaking, only partly subsidized by the fur trade. This led to a scaling back of the original plans. By 1628, a smaller fort was constructed with walls containing a mixture of clay and sand.

The fort also served as the center of trading activity. It contained a barracks, the church, a house for the West India Company director and a warehouse for the storage of company goods. Troops from the fort used the triangle between the Heerestraat and what came to be known as Whitehall Street for marching drills.

1624–1664

Verhulst, with his council, was responsible for the selection of Manhattan as a permanent place of settlement and for situating Fort Amsterdam. He was replaced as the company director of New Netherland by Peter Minuit in 1626. According to the writer Nathaniel Benchley, to legally safeguard the settlers' investments, possessions and farms on Manhattan island, Minuit negotiated the "purchase" of Manhattan from a band of Canarse from Brooklyn who occupied the bottom quarter of Manhattan, known then as the Manhattoes, for 60 guilders' worth of trade goods. Minuit conducted the transaction with the Canarse chief Seyseys, who was only too happy to accept valuable merchandise in exchange for an island that was actually mostly controlled by the Weckquaesgeeks. The deed itself has not survived, so the specific details are unknown. A textual reference to the deed became the foundation for the legend that Minuit had purchased Manhattan from the Native Americans for twenty-four dollars' worth of trinkets and beads, the guilder rate at the time being about two and a half to a Spanish dollar. The price of 60 Dutch guilders in 1626 amounts to around $1,100 in 2012 dollars. Further complicating the calculation is that the value of goods in the area would have been different than the value of those same goods in the developed market of the Netherlands.

The Dutch exploited the hydropower of existing creeks by constructing mills at Turtle Bay (between present-day East 45th–48th Streets) and Montagne's Kill, later called Harlem Mill Creek (East 108th Street). In 1639 a sawmill was located in the northern forest at what was later the corner of East 74th Street and Second Avenue, at which African slaves cut lumber.

The New Amsterdam settlement had a population of approximately 270 people, including infants. In 1642 the new director Willem Kieft decided to build a stone church within the fort. The work was carried out by recent English immigrants, the brothers John and Richard Ogden. The church was finished in 1645 and stood until destroyed in the Slave Insurrection of 1741.

A pen-and-ink view of New Amsterdam, drawn on-the-spot and discovered in the map collection of the Austrian National Library in Vienna in 1991, provides a unique view of New Amsterdam as it appeared from Capske (small Cape) Rock in 1648. It was associated with Adriaen van der Donck's Remonstrance of New Netherland, and may have inspired later views as by Claes Jansz. Visscher. Capske Rock was situated in the water close to Manhattan between Manhattan and Noten Eylant, and signified the start of the East River roadstead.

New Amsterdam received municipal rights on February 2, 1653, thus becoming a city. Albany, then named Beverwyck, received its city rights in 1652. Nieuw Haarlem, now known as Harlem, was formally recognized in 1658.

The first Jews known to have lived in New Amsterdam arrived in 1654. First to arrive were Solomon Pietersen and Jacob Barsimson, who sailed during the summer of 1654 directly from Holland, with passports that gave them permission to trade in the colony. Then in early September, 23 Jewish refugees arrived from the Brazilian city of Recife, which had been conquered by the Portuguese in January 1654. The director-general of New Netherland, Peter Stuyvesant, sought to turn them away but was ultimately overruled by the directors of the Dutch West India Company in Amsterdam. Asser Levy, an Ashkenazi Jew who was one of the 23 refugees, eventually prospered and in 1661 became the first Jew to own a house in New Amsterdam, which also made him the first Jew known to have owned a house anywhere in North America.

In 1661, the Communipaw ferry was founded and began a long history of trans-Hudson ferry and ultimately rail and road transportation. On September 15, 1655, New Amsterdam was attacked by 2,000 Native Americans as part of the Peach Tree War. They destroyed 28 farms, killed 100 settlers, and took 150 prisoners.

Later owners of the property George Elphinstone and Abraham Shotwell replaced the sawmill with a leather mill in 1677. The Saw Kill was later redirected into a culvert, arched over, and its trickling little stream was called Arch Brook.

English capture

On August 27, 1664, while England and the Dutch Republic were at peace, four English frigates sailed into New Amsterdam's harbor and demanded New Netherland's surrender, effecting the bloodless capture of New Amsterdam. On September 6, the local Dutch deciding not to offer resistance, Stuyvesant's lawyer Johannes de Decker and five other delegates signed the official Articles of Surrender of New Netherland. This was swiftly followed by the Second Anglo-Dutch War, between England and the Dutch Republic. In June 1665, New Amsterdam was reincorporated under English law as New York City, named after the Duke of York (later King James II). He was the brother of King Charles II, who had been granted the lands.

In 1667, the Treaty of Breda ended the conflict in favor of the Dutch. The Dutch did not press their claims on New Netherland but did demand control over the valuable sugar plantations and factories captured by them that year on the coast of Surinam, giving them full control over the coast of what is now Guyana and Suriname.

In July 1673, during the Third Anglo-Dutch War, the Dutch quickly but briefly retook the colony of New Netherland, which the English called "New York", with a combined fleet of a squadron of ships from Amsterdam and a squadron of ships from Zeeland. The commanders were Jacob Benckes (Koudum, 1637–1677) and Cornelis Evertsen de Jongste (Vlissingen, 1642–1706) under instruction of the States General of the Dutch Republic. Anthony Colve was installed as the first Dutch governor of the province. Previously there had only been West India Company Directors and a Director-General.

Amidst the recapture, New York City would be again renamed, this time to New Orange. However, after the signing of the Treaty of Westminster in November 1674, both the Dutch territories were relinquished to the English. With the transfer of control, the names New Netherland and New Orange reverted to the English versions of "New York" and "New York City", respectively. Surinam became an official Dutch possession in return.

Cartography

The beginnings of New Amsterdam, unlike most other colonies in the New World, were thoroughly documented in city maps. During the time of New Netherland's colonization, the Dutch were the pre-eminent cartographers in Europe. The delegated authority of the Dutch West India Company over New Netherland required maintaining sovereignty on behalf of the States General, generating cash flow through commercial enterprise for its shareholders, and funding the province's growth. Thus its directors regularly required that censuses be taken. These tools to measure and monitor the province's progress were accompanied by accurate maps and plans. These surveys, as well as grassroots activities to seek redress of grievances, account for the existence of some of the most important of the early documents.

There is a particularly detailed city map called the Castello Plan produced in 1660. Virtually every structure in New Amsterdam at the time is believed to be represented, and by cross-referencing the Nicasius de Sille List of 1660, which enumerates all the citizens of New Amsterdam and their addresses, it can be determined who resided in every house.

The city map known as the Duke's Plan probably derived from the same 1660 census as the Castello Plan. The Duke's Plan includes two outlying areas of development on Manhattan along the top of the plan. The work was created for James (1633–1701), the Duke of York and Albany, after whom New York, New York City, and New York's Capital – Albany, were named just after the seizure of New Amsterdam by the British. After that provisional relinquishment of New Netherland, Stuyvesant reported to his superiors that he "had endeavored to promote the increase of population, agriculture and commerce...the flourishing condition which might have been more flourishing if the now afflicted inhabitants had been protected by a suitable garrison...and had been helped with the long sought for settlement of the boundary, or in default thereof had they been seconded with the oft besought reinforcement of men and ships against the continual troubles, threats, encroachments and invasions of the British neighbors and government of Hartford Colony, our too powerful enemies".

The existence of these city maps has proven to be very useful in the archaeology of New York City. For instance, the Castello map aided the excavation of the Stadthuys (City Hall) of New Amsterdam in determining the exact location of the building.

Layout

The maps enable a precise reconstruction of the town. Fort Amsterdam was located at the southernmost tip of the island of Manhattan, which today is surrounded by Bowling Green. The Battery is a reference to its battery of cannon.

Broadway was the main street that led out of town north towards Harlem. The town was surrounded to the north by a wall leading from the eastern to the western shore. Today, where the course of this city wall was, is Wall Street. Nearby, a canal which led from the harbor inland was filled in 1676, and is today Broad Street.

The layout of the streets was winding, as in a European city. Only starting from Wall Street going toward uptown did the typical grid become enforced long after the town ceased to be Dutch. Most of the Financial District overlaps with New Amsterdam and has retained its original street layout.

Legacy

The 1625 date of the founding of New Amsterdam is now commemorated in the official Seal of New York City. (Formerly, the year on the seal was 1664, the year of the provisional Articles of Transfer, assuring New Netherlanders that they "shall keep and enjoy the liberty of their consciences in religion", negotiated with the English by Peter Stuyvesant and his council.)

Sometimes considered a dysfunctional trading post by the English who later acquired it from the Dutch, Russell Shorto, author of The Island at the Center of the World, suggests that the city left its cultural marks on later New York and, by extension, the United States as a whole.

Major recent historical research has been based on a set of documents that have survived from that period, untranslated. They are the administrative records of the colony, unreadable by most scholars. Since the 1970s, Charles Gehring of the New Netherland Institute has made it his life's work to translate this first-hand history of the Colony of New Netherland.

The scholarly conclusion has largely been that the settlement of New Amsterdam is much more like current New York than previously thought. Cultural diversity and a mindset that resembles the American Dream were already present in the first few years of this colony. Writers like Russell Shorto argue that the large influence of New Amsterdam on the American psyche has largely been overlooked in the classic telling of American beginnings, because of animosity between the English victors and the conquered Dutch.

The original 17th-century architecture of New Amsterdam has completely vanished (affected by the fires of 1776 and 1835), leaving only archaeological remnants. The original street plan of New Amsterdam has stayed largely intact, as have some houses outside Manhattan.

The presentation of the legacy of the unique culture of 17th-century New Amsterdam remains a concern of preservationists and educators. In 2009 the National Park Service celebrated the 400th anniversary of Henry Hudson's 1609 voyage on behalf of the Dutch with the New Amsterdam Trail.

The Dutch-American historian and journalist Hendrik Willem van Loon wrote in 1933 a work of alternative history entitled "If the Dutch Had Kept Nieuw Amsterdam" (in If, Or History Rewritten, edited by J. C. Squire, 1931, Simon & Schuster).

A similar theme, at greater length, was taken up by writer Elizabeth Bear, who published the "New Amsterdam" series of detective stories that take place in a world where the city remained Dutch until the Napoleonic Wars and retained its name also afterward.

One of New York's Broadway theatres is the New Amsterdam Theatre. The name New Amsterdam is also written on the architrave situated on top of the row of columns in front of the Manhattan Municipal Building, commemorating the name of the Dutch colony.

Although no architectural monuments or buildings have survived, the legacy lived on in the form of Dutch Colonial Revival architecture. A number of structures in New York City were constructed in the 19th and 20th centuries in this style, such as Wallabout Market in Brooklyn, South William Street in Manhattan, West End Collegiate Church at West 77th Street, and others.

See also
 Jacobus van de Water

Notes

Further reading

Secondary sources 
 Burrows, Edwin G., and Mike Wallace. Gotham: A History of New York City to 1898 (2000)  excerpt and text search
 
 Jacobs, Jaap. The Colony of New Netherland: A Dutch Settlement in Seventeenth-Century America (2009) excerpt and text search
 Kammen, Michael. Colonial New York: A History New York: Oxford University Press, 1975.
 McFarlane, Jim. Penelope: A Novel of New Amsterdam, Greer, SC: Twisted Cedar Press, 2012. 371 pages. 
 Schmidt, Benjamin, Innocence Abroad: The Dutch Imagination and the New World, 1570–1670, Cambridge: University Press, 2001. 
 Scheltema, Gajus and Westerhuijs, Heleen, eds. Exploring Historic Dutch New York (Museum of the City of New York/Dover Publications, 2011). 
 
 Swerling, Beverley, City of Dreams: A Novel of Nieuw Amsterdam and Early Manhattan, Simon & Schuster, 2002.

Primary sources
 Jackson, Kenneth T. and David S. Dunbar, eds. Empire City: New York Through the Centuries (2005), 1015 pages of excerpts; excerpt

External links

 
 The New Amsterdam Trail, a downloadable audio walking tour of Lower Manhattan
 Nieuw Amsterdam to New York, an audio history from the National Parks of New York Harbor Conservancy
 New Amsterdam from the New Netherland Project
 3D model of New Amsterdam in 1660, a historical reconstruction based on the Castello Plan
 Mapping Early New York - interactive map and encyclopedia.
 "Conditions as Created by Their Lords Burgomasters of Amsterdam" is a publication, from 1656, about goals to populate New Amsterdam

+
1625 establishments in the Dutch Empire
1664 disestablishments in the Dutch Empire
1664 disestablishments in the Thirteen Colonies
Dutch-American culture in New York (state)
Historic Jewish communities in the United States
History of New York City
Populated places established by the Dutch West India Company
Populated places established in the 1620s
Pre-statehood history of New York (state)